Albert Lacroix was a 19th-century Belgian publisher and printer who risked launching some seminal authors like the Goncourt brothers and Émile Zola. In 1869 he published Les Chants de Maldoror by Comte de Lautréamont. However, fearing prosecution for blasphemy and obscenity, he ultimately refused to sell the book. In 1862, he was the original publisher of Les Misérables under the name Librairie internationale A. Lacroix, Verboeckhoven, et Cie.

References 

Lautréamont "Los Cantos de Maldoror". Edition by Manuel Serrat. Cátedra. Letras Universales, Madrid, 1988. 

Print editors
Belgian printers
1834 births
1903 deaths